Grant Carveth Wells (21 January 1887 — 16 February 1957) was a British adventurer, travel writer, and television personality in the mid-twentieth century.

Wells was the author of eighteen travel-related books, including Six Years in the Malay Jungle, Road to Shalimar, and North of Singapore.

Wells also produced films, radio and television shows relating to his travels.

Biography

Wells was born in Surrey, England.  He graduated from London University in 1909, with an engineering degree.

In 1912, the British government sent Wells to its then-colony of Malaya, to survey the route for a railroad, and to explore the flora and fauna of the region. Here he was the first person to report an encounter with the Mayah people of the Tanum Valley, Pahang. However, Wells' health suffered badly in Malaya. In 1918, he moved to the United States, and settled in San Francisco.  In San Francisco, Wells started lecturing on his travel experiences.

Wells led expeditions to Kenya, Tanganyika, Mt. Ararat, Panama, Mexico, Japan, Morocco, Syria, Egypt, Palestine, India and Manchuria.

In 1932, Wells married his wife, the former Zetta Robart.  Robart had been Wells' production manager.  In 1934, Wells' first wife, Laura T. Wells, sued Ms. Robart, alleging misconduct and alienation of affections.

In the early 1930s, Wells and his wife travelled to Soviet Russia, on a trip that would take him to the borders of Turkey, in search of the remains of Noah's Ark.  On the trip, Wells observed the Soviet famine of 1932-33, which would eventually kill millions of Russians.  Wells also encountered a group living in the Carpathian mountains, which still had chainmail left over from the Crusades. Wells recorded his observations of the trip in his book, Kapoot: The Narrative of a Journey From Leningrad to Mount Ararat in Search of Noah's Ark.

In the 1930s and 40s, Wells and his wife began producing films concerning their travels.  They jointly produced The Jungle Killer (1932), Russia Today (1933), and Australia Wild and Strange.

In his book, North of Singapore, written in 1939, Wells documented Japanese attitudes towards the United States and China on the eve of World War II.

On that same trip to the Far East, in 1939, Wells adopted a talking mina bird—which he named "Raffles."  Raffles appeared with Wells on many radio programs and at theaters.  He is credited with helping Wells sell more than $1 million of war bonds in the United States during the Second World War.

Wells lectured widely in the United States, Britain, Norway and Sweden.  In 1942, he was a civilian orientation lecturer for servicemen about to go abroad.
 
On 9 June 1946 the couple produced one of the world's first television shows, Geographically Speaking, which featured home movies of their travels.  The show was not recorded, since recording technology did not yet exist.  The series ended in December 1946, when the couple ran out of home movies.

At the time of his death, in 1957, Wells and his wife were producing a local television show in New York, called Carveth Wells Explores the World.

Books by Carveth Wells

(1925) In Coldest Africa
(1925) A Jungle Man and His Animals  
(1931) Congo to the Mountains of the Moon:  Adventure! 
(1932) Adventure
(1932) Let's Do the Mediterranean  

(1933) Light on the Dark Continent 
(1934) Exploring the World With Carveth Wells 

(1939) Around the World with Bobby and Betty 
(1940) North Of Singapore
(1941) Raff, the Jungle Bird:The Story of Our Talking Mynah 

(1954) The Road To Shalimar

References

1887 births
1957 deaths
20th-century British writers
People from Surrey
British travel writers
British adventure books
British television people
English explorers
British expatriates in Malaysia
Alumni of the University of London